Richard Lybbe (1479–1527/28), of Tavistock, Devon and Englefield, Berkshire, was an English politician.

Family

Lybbe was the eldest son of Richard Lybbe of Tavistock and his wife, Joan. Lybbe married, in 1521 or later, Bridget Justice, daughter of the MP, William Justice. They had one son and two daughters.

Career
He was a Member (MP) of the Parliament of England for Tavistock in 1515.

References

15th-century births
1528 deaths
People from Englefield, Berkshire
Members of the Parliament of England for Tavistock
English MPs 1515